The following ships of the Indian Navy have been named INS Talwar:

  was a Type 12,  commissioned in 1959, which served in the Portuguese-Indian War and the Indo-Pakistani War of 1971
  is the lead ship of her class, currently in active service with the Indian Navy

Indian Navy ship names